, meaning "spring" or "fountain", is a Japanese given name and surname. While a unisex name, it is more commonly used by women. People with the name include:

As given name
 , actress
 , stage name Minami Takayama, voice actress and singer
, Japanese actress
, Japanese sprint canoeist
 , Tibetologist
 , actress
 , Japanese swimmer
 , manga artist
 , pianist
 , manga artist
 , actress and singer
 , professional Go player
 , former football player
 , real name Kazuya Terashima, manga artist
 , model and tarento
 , real name Motohisa Yamawaki, Kyōgen actor
 , founder member of the Japanese band Aion
 Izumi Nakadai (born 1988), member of Bon-Bon Blanco
 , United Nations official
 , real name Sachiko Kamachi, singer
 , real name Keiko Ishida, actress
 , American anthropologist
 , Japanese novelist and actor
 , health scientist, founder of the Tabata protocol
 , manga artist and illustrator
 , manga artist
 , actress
 , football player
, Japanese politician
 , singer and actress
 , princess during the Asuka period and Nara period

As surname
 , Japanese-born Indian footballer
 Bob Izumi, (born 1958), Canadian angler
 , Judoka and mixed martial artist
 , former long-distance runner
 , manga artist
 , Japanese baseball player
 , author
 Masaki Izumi, Japanese shogi player
 , actor
 , football player
 , real name Sayo Takemoto (née Eguchi), actress and singer
 , fashion model and gravure idol
 , football player
 , previously verified by Guinness to be the oldest man ever, but whose case is now disputed
 , mid Heian period poet, member of the Thirty-Six Immortals of Poetry
Sayoko Izumi (泉, born 1988), singer-songwriter
, Japanese painter and printmaker
 , actor
 , politician
 , actor
 , actor
 , football player
 , archaeologist
 , Supreme Court of Japan member

Fictional characters

Characters with the given name

 Izumi, the current Fire Lord of the Fire Nation, from Avatar the Last Airbender
Izumi (Shelly), a member of Team Aqua in the Pokémon anime
Izumi, a character from anime Parasol Henbe
Izumi Akazawa, a character in  Another
Izumi Curtis, a character in Fullmetal Alchemist
Izumi Chiba, a character in Natsunagu!
Himuro Izumi, a character in Princess Nine
Izumi Izosaki, a character in I"s
Izumi Kanai, a character in Battle Royale
Izumi Uchiha, character in NARUTO SHIPPUDEN
Doll Izumi, a character in Super Doll Licca-chan
Izumi Miyamura, main character in Horimiya
Izumi Yukitaka, a character in Haikyuu!!
Izumi Nase, a character in Kyoukai no Kanata
Izumi Maki, a character in Soar High! Isami
Izumi Orimoto (Zoe Orimoto in all English dubs), a character in Digimon Frontier
Izumi Sakurai, a character from the anime and manga series Nichijou
Izumi Segawa, a character in Hayate the Combat Butler
 , a character in Full Moon o Sagashite
 , a character in Hanazakari no Kimitachi e
 , a character in He Is My Master
 , a character in Love Stage!!
Izumi Shimomura, A Character In "Ajin"
Izumi Toraishi, a character in Star-Myu
Izumi Kyouka, A character in Bungo Stray Dogs
Izumi Sena, A character in Ensemble Stars!\

Characters with the surname
 , the protagonist of the series Parasyte
 , protagonist of Lucky Star
Kota Izumi, a character in My Hero Academia
Koushiro "Izzy" Izumi, a character in Digimon Adventure
Shion Izumi, a character in Gantz
Ako Izumi, a character in Negima! Magister Negi Magi
Kaori Izumi, a character in Best Student Council
Hina Izumi, a character in Kamen Rider OOO
Gaku Izumi, a character in Flunk Punk Rumble
Ken Izumi, the protagonist of the toon Chargeman Ken!
Kagura Izumi, one of the protagonists of the Ressha Sentai ToQger
Mitsuki Izumi and Iori Izumi, the members of Idolish7 in Idolish7
Sagiri Izumi, the protagonist of Eromanga Sensei
Kohei Izumi, a character in World Trigger
Noa Izumi, protagonist of Patlabor

References

Japanese-language surnames
Japanese unisex given names